Australian Registered Scheme Number (ARSN) is a nine digit number issued to Australian managed investment schemes by Australian Securities and Investments Commission.  The number is required to be printed on all material, and is similar to an Australian Business Number and Australian Company Number.

External links 
 managed investment schemes - An overview, ASIC
 Corporations Act 2001: Definitions
 Corporations Act 2001 Sect 601EB: Registration of managed investment scheme

Investment in Australia
Australian Securities and Investments Commission
National identification numbers